{{DISPLAYTITLE:C14H16N2}}
The molecular formula C14H16N2 (molar mass: 212.29 g/mol) may refer to:

 Atipamezole
 Diphenylethylenediamine
 Ergoline
 Naphthylpiperazine
 Tolidine

Molecular formulas